The Milcov or Urlătura is a left tributary of the river Olt in Romania. It flows into the Olt in Milcovu din Vale near Slatina.

References

Rivers of Olt County
Rivers of Romania